An event camera, also known as a neuromorphic camera, silicon retina or dynamic vision sensor, is an imaging sensor that responds to local changes in brightness. Event cameras do not capture images using a shutter as conventional (frame) cameras do. Instead, each pixel inside an event camera operates independently and asynchronously, reporting changes in brightness as they occur, and staying silent otherwise.

Functional description 
Event camera pixels independently respond to changes in brightness as they occur. Each pixel stores a reference brightness level, and continuously compares it to the current brightness level. If the difference in brightness exceeds a threshold, that pixel resets its reference level and generates an event: a discrete packet that contains the pixel address and timestamp. Events may also contain the polarity (increase or decrease) of a brightness change, or an instantaneous measurement of the illumination level. Thus, event cameras output an asynchronous stream of events triggered by changes in scene illumination.Event cameras have microsecond temporal resolution, 120 dB dynamic range, and less under/overexposure and motion blur than frame cameras. This allows them to track object and camera movement (optical flow) more accurately. They yield grey-scale information. Initially (2014), resolution was limited to 100 pixels. A later entry reached 640x480 resolution in 2019. Because individual pixels fire independently, event cameras appear suitable for integration with asynchronous computing architectures such as neuromorphic computing.  Pixel independence allows these cameras to cope with scenes with brightly and dimly lit regions without having to average across them.

*Indicates temporal resolution since human eyes and event cameras do not output frames.

Types 
Temporal contrast sensors (such as DVS  (Dynamic Vision Sensor) or sDVS  (sensitive-DVS)) produce events that indicate polarity (increase or decrease in brightness), while temporal image sensors indicate the instantaneous intensity with each event. The DAVIS (Dynamic and Active-pixel Vision Sensor) contains a global shutter active pixel sensor (APS) in addition to the dynamic vision sensor (DVS) that shares the same photosensor array. Thus, it has the ability to produce image frames alongside events. Many event cameras additionally carry an inertial measurement unit (IMU).

Retinomorphic sensors 

Another class of event sensors are so-called retinomorphic sensors. While the term retinomorphic has been used to describe event sensors generally, in 2020 it was adopted as the name for a specific sensor design based on a resistor and photosensitive capacitor in series. These capacitors are distinct from photocapacitors, which are used to store solar energy, and are instead designed to change capacitance under illumination. They charge/discharge slightly when the capacitance is changed, but otherwise remain in equilibrium. When a photosensitive capacitor is placed in series with a resistor, and an input voltage is applied across the circuit, the result is a sensor that outputs a voltage when the light intensity changes, but otherwise does not.

Unlike other event sensors (typically a photodiode and some other circuit elements), these sensors produce the signal inherently. They can hence be considered a single device that produces the same result as a small circuit in other event cameras. Retinomorphic sensors have to-date only been studied in a research environment.

Algorithms

Image reconstruction 
Image reconstruction from events has the potential to create images and video with high dynamic range, high temporal resolution and reduced motion blur. Image reconstruction can be achieved using temporal smoothing, e.g. high-pass or complementary filter. Alternative methods include optimization and gradient estimation followed by Poisson integration.

Spatial convolutions 
The concept of spatial event-driven convolution was postulated in 1999 (before the DVS), but later generalized during EU project CAVIAR (during which the DVS was invented) by projecting event-by-event an arbitrary convolution kernel around the event coordinate in an array of integrate-and-fire pixels. Extension to multi-kernel event-driven convolutions allows for event-driven deep convolutional neural networks.

Motion detection and tracking 
Segmentation and detection of moving objects viewed by an event camera can seem to be a trivial task, as it is done by the sensor on-chip. However, these tasks are difficult, because events carry little information and do not contain useful visual features like texture and color. These tasks become further challenging given a moving camera, because events are triggered everywhere on the image plane, produced by moving objects and the static scene (whose apparent motion is induced by the camera’s ego-motion). Some of the recent approaches to solving this problem include the incorporation of motion-compensation models and traditional clustering algorithms.

Potential applications 
Potential applications include object recognition, autonomous vehicles, and robotics. The US military is considering infrared and other event cameras because of their lower power consumption and reduced heat generation.

See also 

 Neuromorphic engineering
 Retinomorphic sensor
 Rolling shutter

References 

Science of photography
Image sensors